Count Luitpold Alfred Friedrich Karl of Castell-Castell (born November 14, 1904 in Langenzell, Wiesenbach, Grand Duchy of Baden; died November 6 or 8, 1941 in Bankya near Sofia, Kingdom of Bulgaria) was a staff officer in the German Army during World War II and a member of the extended Danish Royal Family through his marriage to Princess Alexandrine-Louise of Denmark. Luitpold was a Count of Castell-Castell and a member of the Comital House of Castell-Castell.

Family
Luitpold was born on November 14, 1904 in Langenzell, Wiesenbach, Grand Duchy of Baden and was the eldest child and son of Count Otto Friedrich of Castell-Castell and his wife, Princess Amélie of Löwenstein-Wertheim-Freudenberg.

Marriage and issue
Luitpold's engagement to Princess Alexandrine-Louise of Denmark, third child and daughter of Prince Harald of Denmark and his wife Princess Helena Adelaide of Schleswig-Holstein-Sonderburg-Glücksburg, was announced on August 24, 1936 by special permission of Alexandrine-Louise's uncle Christian X of Denmark. Until the announcement, Alexandrine-Louise had been frequently mentioned as a possible queen consort to Edward VIII. The couple met for the first time in Berlin during the 1936 Summer Olympics. Following their first meeting, Luitpold and Alexandrine-Louise spent nearly every day together. Before her departure from Berlin, Luitpold proposed marriage and Alexandrine-Louise accepted. At the time of their engagement announcement, Luitpold was a law student residing in Munich.

Luitpold and Alexandrine-Louise were married on January 22, 1937 at Christiansborg Palace in Copenhagen, Kingdom of Denmark. Footage of the wedding on nitrate film is preserved by the Danish Film Institute in their bunker archive for nitrate film at Store Dyrehave in Hillerød. According to the film archivist Karin Bonde Johansen regarding the scenes captured by the film, "the atmosphere looks cheerful and wild looking, but unfortunately there is no audio to the footage."

Luitpold and Alexandrine-Louise had three children:

 Countess Amélie Alexandrine Helene Caroline Mathilde Pauline of Castell-Castell (b. Berlin May 25, 1938); m. Hochburg (civil) September 3, 1965 (religious) September 5, 1965 Oscar Ritter von Miller zu Aichholz (b. Vienna July 7, 1934)
 Countess Thyra Antonie Marie-Therese Feodora Agnes of Castell-Castell (b. Berlin September 14, 1939); m. Copenhagen November 3, 1961 Karl Moritz Moes (b. Copenhagen October 17, 1937)
 Count Otto-Luitpold Gustav Friedrich Christian Harald Carl Castell-Castell (b. Berlin March 13, 1942 – d. Berlin March 19, 1943)

Military service and death
Luitpold was a First Lieutenant in the German Army during World War II. He died of his injuries from an airplane crash in action at a military hospital at Bankya near Sofia, Kingdom of Bulgaria on November 6 or 8, 1941 at the age of 36. Luitpold was interred at Bankya, and reinterred in the Castell-Castell family plot at the cemetery in Hochburg.

Ancestry

References

Citations

Bibliography

External links
 Wedding photograph of Count Luitpold of Castell-Castell and Princess Alexandrine-Louise of Denmark

1904 births
1941 deaths
People from Rhein-Neckar-Kreis
People from the Grand Duchy of Baden
House of Castell
German Army personnel killed in World War II
German Army officers of World War II
Military personnel from Baden-Württemberg
Victims of aviation accidents or incidents in Bulgaria